Medina Valley Independent School District is a public school district based in Castroville, Texas.

In addition to LaCoste, the district also serves the city of Castroville and the surrounding area. Located in Medina County, a small portion of the district extends into Bexar County.

In 2009, the school district was rated "academically acceptable" by the Texas Education Agency.

Schools
High School (Grades 9-12)
Medina Valley High School
Middle Schools (Grades 6-8)
Medina Valley Middle School
Loma Alta Middle School
Elementary Schools (Grades PK-5)
Castroville Elementary
LaCoste Elementary
Potranco Elementary
Luckey Ranch Elementary
Ladera Elementary

References

External links
 

School districts in Medina County, Texas
School districts in Bexar County, Texas
1960 establishments in Texas
School districts established in 1960